Michael Dunlop (born 1989) is a Northern Irish motorcycle racer.

Michael Dunlop may also refer to:
 Michael Dunlop (footballer, born 1957), Scottish football forward
 Michael Dunlop (footballer, born 1982), Scottish football defender